The Via Julia Augusta (modern Italian Via Giulia Augusta) is the name given to the Roman road formed by the merging of the Via Aemilia Scauri with the Via Postumia. The road runs from Placentia (modern Piacenza) to Arelate (modern Arles), initially westward along the edge of the plain of the River Po to Derthona (Tortona), then southward to the Ligurian coast. There it formed a continuous route westward along the precipitous descent of the Ligurian mountains into the sea. This takes it to Vada Sabatia (Vado Ligure), Albingaunum (Albenga) and Album Intimilium (Ventimiglia), continuing to La Turbie (above modern Monaco), where its original terminus was marked by a triumphal arch. Later it was extended, taking a route away from the coast via the valley of the River Laghet, north of Nice and westward to Arles where it joined the Via Domitia.

It was begun in 13 BCE by Augustus, and its engineering works were repeatedly renewed by later emperors. However by about 420 CE, when Rutilius Namatianus returned to Gaul from Italia, he took ship past the Maritime Alps rather than rely upon the decaying road. In 1764 Tobias Smollett similarly travelled by sea rather than use the seaside tracks, fit only for "mules and foot passengers". Road access was not restored until the time of Napoleon.

Roman bridges

There are the remains of a number of Roman bridges along the road, including the Pont des Esclapes Pont Flavien; Pontaccio; Ponte dell’Acqua; Ponte delle Fate; Ponte delle Voze; Ponte Lungo; Ponte sul Rio della Torre; Primo Ponte di Val Ponci; Quarto Ponte di Val Ponci and Pontetto.

See also
Roman engineering

External links

References

Giulia Augusta, Via
Giulia Augusta, Via
Augustus